"She's Crazy for Leavin'" is a song co-written by American country music artists and somgwriters Rodney Crowell and Guy Clark. Crowell released the song in September 1988 as the third single from the album Diamonds & Dirt. The song was Crowell's second number one country hit as a solo artist. The single went to number one for one week and spent a total of 14 weeks on the country chart.

It was originally recorded by Clark on his 1981 album The South Coast of Texas, which Crowell produced.

The song was also recorded by Steve Wariner and appeared on his 1985 album Life's Highway but was never released as a single.

Chart performance

Year-end charts

References
 

1988 singles
1981 songs
Steve Wariner songs
Rodney Crowell songs
Songs written by Rodney Crowell
Songs written by Guy Clark
Song recordings produced by Tony Brown (record producer)
Columbia Records singles
Song recordings produced by Rodney Crowell